Tokodi Üveggyári Sport Club was a Hungarian football club from the town of Tokod, Hungary.

History
Tokodi Üveggyári SC debuted in the 1940–41 season of the Hungarian League and finished ninth.

Name Changes 
1926–1951: Tokodi Üveggyári Sport Club
1951–?: Tokodi Üveggyári Építők
1956–1992: Tokodi Üveggyári Munkás SE
1992–2008: Tokodi Üveggyári Sport Club
2008: dissolved

References

External links
 Profile

Football clubs in Hungary
Defunct football clubs in Hungary
1911 establishments in Hungary